Oru Thathvika Avalokanam is a 2021 Indian Malayalam-language political-comedy film written and directed by Akhil Marar, produced by Dr. Geevarghese Yohannan under the banner Yohan Productions. The film stars Joju George, Aju Varghese and Shammi Thilakan with Mammukoya, Abhirami and Niranj Maniyanpilla Raju in supporting roles.  The film was released theatrically on 31 December 2021.

Premise
Follows the challenges in the life of a youngster, and events that change his life.

Production
The film was officially announced on 6 September 2020. The shooting of the film was started in January 2021 and wrapped in September 2021.

Cast
Joju George as Shanker
Niranj Maniyanpilla Raju as Nandakumar
Aju Varghese as Chandran
Mammukoya as Aseem Bhai
Shammi Thilakan as Satyan
Abhirami as Sri
Azees Nedumangad as Damodaran Kili 
Major Ravi as Vattavila Raghavan
Prasanth
Jayakrishnan as Padmakumar
Prem Kumar
Balaji Sarma as SI Thangachan
Nandhan Unni as Unni
Praveen Sudhakar Jalaja
Manuraj
Sundarapandian
K.P Suresh Kumar

Music

The music of the film is composed by O. K. Ravi Shankar.

Release
The film was released worldwide on 31 December 2021.

References

External links